Colorado's 19th Senate district is one of 35 districts in the Colorado Senate. It has been represented by Democrat Rachel Zenzinger since 2017, following her defeat of incumbent Republican Laura Woods.

Geography
District 19 is based in Denver's northwestern suburbs in Jefferson County, covering most of Arvada and parts of Westminster.

The district is located entirely within Colorado's 7th congressional district, and overlaps with the 24th, 27th, and 29th districts of the Colorado House of Representatives.

Recent election results
Colorado state senators are elected to staggered four-year terms; under normal circumstances, the 19th district holds elections in presidential years.

2020

2016

2014
In 2013, incumbent Democrat Evie Hudak chose to resign rather than face a recall election, and her former campaign manager Rachel Zenzinger was appointed to her seat. The resignation triggered an off-cycle election in 2014 which Zenzinger lost to Laura Woods.

2012

Federal and statewide results in District 19

References 

19
Jefferson County, Colorado